Alexander John Farley (11 May 1925 – 23 February 2010) was an English professional footballer who played in the Football League for Leyton Orient as a left back.

Personal life 
During the Second World War, Farley served at home as a PE instructor in the Irish Guards.

Career statistics

References 

Clapton Orient F.C. wartime guest players
English Football League players
English footballers
Association football fullbacks
1925 births
2010 deaths
Footballers from Southampton
Finchley F.C. players
Leyton Orient F.C. players
AFC Bournemouth players
British Army personnel of World War II
Irish Guards soldiers